Chors may refer to:

 Chors (deity), or Khors, a Slavic god
 Chors Rural District, in Iran
 Chors, Iran, a village
 Chors Patera, a volcanic feature on Io

See also 
 Chor (disambiguation)
 Chores (disambiguation)